Dudeşti may refer to:

 Dudeşti culture, an archeological culture of the 6th millennium BC
 Dudești, Bucharest
 Dudești, Brăila, a commune in Brăila County
 Dudeşti, a village in Luncoiu de Jos Commune, Hunedoara County
 Dudeștii Noi, a commune in Timiș County, Romania
 Dudeștii Vechi, a commune in Timiș County, Romania

See also 
 Duda (disambiguation)